Jean-Claude Bastos de Morais (born 28 October 1967 in Fribourg) is a Swiss-Angolan entrepreneur who has founded and led several businesses over the course of his career. Among these are Quantum Global Group, an international investment group with a particular focus on Africa and Banco Kwanza Invest, Angola's first investment bank.

Bastos was cited as one of the Top 100 most influential Africans by New African magazine in 2013 and 2017.

Family 
Jean-Claude Bastos de Morais was born on 28 October 1967 in Fribourg, Switzerland. He is of bi-national heritage. His father is from Angola and his mother is Swiss, coming from an entrepreneurial family. His maternal grand-father was an industrialist in the watch industry and invented the light inside the watch. According to Bastos, his late Angolan grandmother inspired him to establish the African Innovation Foundation in 2009.

Education and career 
Bastos studied economics at the University of Fribourg and received a Master of Arts in Management. He financed his studies by starting a regional mergers and acquisitions business that sold small companies. In 1989, Bastos joined Deloitte as a consultant and later Abegglen Management Partners. In 1995, he founded a venture capital company focused on Swiss SMEs.

In 2004 Bastos founded Quantum Capital S.A. in Luanda, Angola, the first company of the Quantum Global Group, which he is Chairman. 
In 2007, Quantum Global Investment Management was founded in Switzerland. As an asset management company for global liquid investments Quantum Global also expanded into the real estate business after establishing Quantum Global Real Estate in June 2009. From 2012, Quantum Global together with Plaza, a joint venture with JLL subsidiary LaSalle, purchased office properties on Savile Row, Fifth Avenue and in Munich. The Tour Blanche in Paris followed in 2014. Other fields of activity of Quantum Global are private equity, portfolio management, and a laboratory for economic research.

In 2008, Bastos de Morais founded Banco Kwanza Invest, Angola's first investment bank.

In September 2015, Quantum Global became a member of the Forest Stewardship Council. In 2016, a fund managed by the group acquired the InterContinental Hotel in Lusaka. In 2020, Quantum Global Investment Management merged with Quantum Global Corporate Services.

Fábrica de Sabão 

In 2015 he launched the hybrid innovation hub, Fábrica de Sabão (The Soap Factory) to support innovation projects in Angola. Fábrica de Sabão, a former soap factory, was converted into a hybrid incubator, co-working space, maker-space, and accelerator hub. The hub is a collaboration with the government, which leases its premises. Fábrica de Sabão was built as an inclusive model to enable marginalized communities to participate in sustainable enterprise such as urban manufacturing.

NGOs
In 2017, Bastos de Morais was elected an international council member, Belfer Center for Science and International Affairs.

African Innovation Foundation 

In 2009, he founded the African Innovation Foundation (AIF) which aims to support sustainable projects in Africa. The Foundation's project "Innovation Prize for Africa (IPA)" was launched in 2011 in cooperation with the United Nations Economic Commission for Africa (UNECA). The IPA is an annual competition that honors African entrepreneurs and innovators through investment in their ecosystems and business development. In 2016 the Innovation Prize for Africa celebrated its 5th anniversary, and the AIF signed a Memorandum of Understanding (MoU) with the World Intellectual Property Organization (WIPO) for cooperation to support African innovators. In February 2017 the AIF signed a MoU with the Botswana Innovation Hub to support innovations in Botswana. In addition to the IPA, the AIF founded the ZuaHub, a platform that connects innovators with resources. By 2017 the IPA had a database of over 6,000 innovators from 51 African countries.

In 2012, the IPA was endorsed by a joint resolution of the African Union (AU) conference of ministers of finance, development and planning, and the United Nations Economic Commission for Africa (UN-ECA) conference of ministers of finance, planning and economic development. The AU/UN-ECA resolution invited "African governments and the private sector to contribute to financing the African Science, Technology and Innovation Endowment Fund and the Innovation Prize for Africa" to ensure the sustainability of the IPA.

African Law Library 
The AIF also initiated the African Law Library (ALL). The project was launched on 28 November 2013 at the African Union's headquarters in Addis Ababa, Ethiopia. With ALL Bastos implemented his idea of an online portal offering access to a wide range of legal documents as well as law and governance texts from African countries. The Huffington Post reported that  'in June 2014 alone, more than 10,000 research sessions were initiated on the African Law Library platform'. In March 2015 over 4,500 regional and national court cases, 3,600 legislative acts and 8,000 secondary sources from eight African countries were published online.

Philanthropic activities 
In October 2011 Bastos founded the Kitangana Tennis Project for orphans in Angola. In 2017, his Quantum Global Group sponsored the Muhr Awards for Arab films at the Dubai International Film Festival. In addition, Bastos supports several Universities. He sponsors a research project at the Center of Neuroscience ZNZ, a collaboration between the University of Zurich and the Swiss Federal Institute of Technology ETH. He also serves on the advisory board of the Event Letterari Monte Verita Festival, the Official Monetary and Financial Institutions Forum (OMFIF) and the University of Cape Town Graduate School of Business.

Criticism 
In 2011, Bastos was convicted together with his partner by a criminal court in Switzerland for "repeated qualified criminal mismanagement". Both have illegally paid out money in an investment company under their control, which partly lined their own pockets. In 2017 the conviction played a major role in public discussions of his business activities which were uncovered by journalists in the Paradise Papers.

Angola sovereign wealth fund 
In 2012, following a selection procedure, Bastos' asset management group Quantum Global was awarded the contract to manage the newly created Angolan sovereign wealth fund, the Fundo Soberano de Angola (FSDEA), with fund assets of US$5 billion.

In November 2017 the BBC News reported about him in relation to the Paradise Papers. The Paradise Papers reported his use of Angola's sovereign wealth fund Fundo Soberano de Angola (FSDEA) for his own investment projects. According to a Bastos interview by The Guardian, FSDEA had not paid brokerage or finder’s fees for those investments where he himself also held a stake. After the Paradise Papers were leaked licenses of seven funds of Bastos' Quantum Global were suspended in Mauritius after a visit of Angolan officials. The Mauritius Supreme Court froze US$519 million on 58 bank accounts of Quantum Global in early April 2018. In London a British court froze US$3 billion on Quantum Global accounts at the end of April 2018.

At the end of July 2018 the freezing of British bank accounts was lifted by London's High Court. It ruled, that the freezing was based on false information. The court accused the state funds representatives of "breaches of the duty of disclosure" in the fund's application for a freezing and called these breaches "substantial" and "culpable". "There is no evidence to suggest that the use of offshore structures by the group was anything other than the normal and legitimate way the group structured itself for tax, regulatory and other proper business purposes; or that Mr Bastos’ personal use of such structures was not his normal modus operandi for legitimate personal reasons." The High Court's ruling stated that limited partnerships in offshore jurisdictions "are not unusual for private equity investments; that they were known about and not disapproved by Deloitte at the time; that the structure was not a matter of criticism by E&Y in their investigations; and that the drawing down of the full committed amounts into the accounts in the names of the Limited Partnerships so as to put them beyond the control of FSDEA was for a legitimate political objective."

After the High Court in London had legally confirmed the contracts between Quantum Global and FSDEA, Bastos was taken into pre-trial detention in Angola in the autumn of 2018 on the charge that he had enriched himself with state property. The media saw the arrest as an attempt by Angola to exert pressure on Quantum Global and Bastos. In March 2019, Angola and Quantum Global reached a settlement. Quantum Global released the mandate early and Bastos received a settlement from Angola that dropped all charges against Bastos and Quantum Global. In Mauritius, the account freezes were lifted and the tax authorities renewed Quantum Global's licenses. Quantum Global withdrew a claim for damages against the FSDEA in London. When the settlement was reached, Bastos was released from pre-trial detention in March 2019.

Writing
He is the co-editor of the book Innovation Ethics. African and Global Perspectives, co-published by Globethics.net and the AIF. The book looks at innovation ethics and the “ethical innovator,” from multidisciplinary and international perspectives with a focus on Africa.
The Convergence of Nations: Why Africa’s Time Is Now, OMFIF Press, in collaboration with a team of 31 authors from 15 nations on how Africa can benefit from changes in the world political and economic environment.
SEED is a collaboration with the African Innovation Foundation (AIF), a Swiss-registered foundation. SEED was published to reinforce the value and benefit of seeding innovation in all fields of development for a rich and prosperous Africa.

Notes

External links
http://www.huffingtonpost.com/jean-claude-bastos-de-morais/
http://www.itnewsafrica.com/2015/05/what-if-african-nations-operated-as-one-big-innovation-ecosystem/
http://www.euromoney.com/Article/3112458/Angola-fund-launch-leaves-questions-unanswered.html
http://www.jeanclaudebastosdemorais.com - personal website
http://www.quantumglobalgroup.com — website of Quantum Global Group
http://www.africabusinesscommunities.com/index.php/rss-abc-interviews/201082-jean-claude-bastos-de-morais-quantum-global-group-how-to-do-business-in-africa
African Innovation Foundation

1967 births
Living people
Swiss businesspeople
People from Fribourg
People named in the Paradise Papers
Swiss people of Angolan descent